Bagre is a genus of sea catfishes found along the Atlantic and Pacific coasts of the Americas from southern North America to northern South America. Currently, four species are described:

 Bagre bagre (Linnaeus, 1766) (coco sea catfish)
 Bagre marinus (Mitchill, 1815) (gafftopsail catfish)
 Bagre panamensis (T. N. Gill, 1863) (Chilhuil sea catfish)
 Bagre pinnimaculatus (Steindachner, 1877) (red sea catfish)

References
 

 
Ariidae
Catfish genera
Taxa named by Hippolyte Cloquet
Marine fish genera